Lucidor is the pen name of Swedish baroque poet Lars "Lasse" Johansson (1638 – 1674).
 
Lucidor can also mean:

 , a US Navy ship used during World War II
 1176 Lucidor, an asteroid